Noodles with tomato egg sauce（）is a traditional Chinese dish. It is very simple to cook. Just as its name implies, it only needs three ingredients: noodles, tomato and egg.

All the three ingredients are common in daily life so noodle with tomato egg sauce is very popular with people in China. Its cooking method is also very easy, which is another reason that people like it, especially the mothers who don't have much time to cook for their children. Except for these three main ingredients, other vegetables or condiments can also be added into this soup, such like onions, cucumbers, carrots and ginger. With these condiments, the noodle can be more delicious.

See also
 List of Chinese dishes
 List of noodle dishes

References 

 http://goods.pcbaby.com.cn/muyingseo/fs/1111/1053956.html
 Noodles with Tomato Egg Sauce

Mixed noodles
Chinese noodle dishes